, provisional designation , is a trans-Neptunian object and member of the Haumea family that resides in the Kuiper belt, located in the outermost region of the Solar System. It was discovered on 19 September 1995, by American astronomer Nichole Danzl of the Spacewatch program at Kitt Peak National Observatory near Tucson, Arizona, in the United States. It measures approximately 200 kilometers in diameter and was the second-brightest known object in the Kuiper belt, after Pluto, until  was discovered.

Origin 

 is a member of the Haumea family. It has the highest collisional velocity, a δv of 123.3 m/s, of all confirmed members.

Naming 

As of 2018, this minor planet has not been named by the Minor Planet Center.

Orbital diagram

References

External links 
 List of Transneptunian Objects, Minor Planet Center
 
 

Haumea family
Classical Kuiper belt objects
1995 SM55
Possible dwarf planets
19950919